Kolta may refer to:

 Kolta, Slovakia, a village and municipality in Slovakia
 Nemeskolta, known pre-1899 as Kolta, a village in Hungary
 Kolta, Ethiopia, a settlement in the Gofa Zone of Ethiopia
 Kolta people, or Koli, a social group of India
 Buatier De Kolta (1845–1903), French magician

See also 
 Colta (disambiguation)
 Kotla (disambiguation)